The Door of No Return is a memorial arch in Ouidah, Benin. The concrete and bronze arch, which stands on the beach, is a memorial to the enslaved Africans who were taken from the slave port of Ouidah to the Americas. 

Several artists and designers collaborated with the architect, Yves Ahouen-Gnimon, to realise the project. The columns and bas-reliefs are by Beninese artist Fortuné Bandeira, the freestanding Egungun are by Yves Kpede and the bronzes are by Dominque Kouas Gnonnou.

See also

Door of Return
Genealogy tourism (Africa)
Year of Return, Ghana 2019

References 

Slavery memorials
Buildings and structures in Benin by type
Arches_and_vaults
Ouidah